Petr Vrabec (born 5 June 1962) is a Czech football manager and former player. He won six Czechoslovak First League titles with Sparta Prague at club level. Vrabec also represented Czechoslovakia, playing three times and scoring once in 1993.

Playing career

Club career
As a player, Vrabec won six league titles in eight seasons with Sparta Prague, racking up 168 appearances and 21 goals between 1985 and 1993. During the 1991–92 European Cup he scored three goals for the club, including one at the Nou Camp stadium against FC Barcelona. In 1993, he went to Germany to play for Stuttgarter Kickers before returning to his homeland with Viktoria Žižkov in the 1994–95 season. Vrabec played in European competitions with Žižkov, scoring in the 4–3 aggregate win in the qualifying round of the 1994–95 UEFA Cup Winners' Cup against IFK Norrköping. He spent his later career with Chmel Blšany, where he suffered a broken leg, which limited him in his final season with the club. In 2000, he stopped playing in order to become youth coach at Blšany.

International career
Vrabec played for Czechoslovakia B in 1992, making a single appearance. The following year he made three appearances for Czechoslovakia, scoring one goal in the process. His only international goal came in a 5–2 win for Czechoslovakia against Romania in qualification for the 1994 World Cup.

Managerial career
Vrabec became assistant manager under Karel Jarolím at Gambrinus Liga side 1. FC Synot in 2003 in a sixteen-month spell which ended in December 2004. In April 2005 Vrabec took up a position as Jarolím's assistant again, this time with Slavia Prague.

Vrabec was named manager of Czech 2. Liga side Čáslav in the summer of 2012, but left his position after just seven games, with the club having won just one and drawn two in this time.

Honours
Sparta Prague
Czechoslovak First League (6): 1986–87, 1987–88, 1988–89, 1989–90, 1990–91, 1992–93

References

External links

1962 births
Living people
Czech footballers
Czechoslovak footballers
Czechoslovakia international footballers
Czech First League players
AC Sparta Prague players
Stuttgarter Kickers players
FK Viktoria Žižkov players
FK Chmel Blšany players
Czech football managers
FK Čáslav managers
Czech expatriate footballers
Expatriate footballers in Germany
Association football defenders
SK Slavia Prague non-playing staff
Association football coaches
Czech National Football League managers